Ross Creek is a stream in Benton County in the U.S. state of Missouri. It is a tributary to Cole Camp Creek.

The stream confluence with Cole Camp Creek is approximately one mile north of the community of Edmonson.

Ross Creek has the name of a pioneer settler.

See also
List of rivers of Missouri

References

Rivers of Benton County, Missouri
Rivers of Missouri